Lisa Roy was an American Music Industry Publicist and Audio consultant, she had a company called Rock & Roy, Lisa was paid tribute by the 64th Annual Grammy Awards in In Memoriam sagement.

References

Music publicists
American publicists